Fernando Pedro "Freddy" Rodríguez Borrego (April 29, 1924 – June 11, 2009) was a Cuban-born professional baseball pitcher who briefly played for the Chicago Cubs (1958) and Philadelphia Phillies (1959) of Major League Baseball.

Rodríguez' professional career extended for 18 seasons, 1945 through 1962, but he would appear in only eight major league games during those brief, late-1950s trials, when he was already in his mid-30s. Apart from the wartime 1945 campaign, his first 11 seasons in Organized Baseball all were spent in the lowest levels of the minor leagues of the day: Classes B, C and D. Finally, in 1956, he rose to the Double-A and Triple-A levels.

In 1958, he was acquired by the Cubs and appeared in seven early-season games as a relief pitcher. He was credited with a save in his April 18 debut, hurling 1 innings of one-hit, scoreless ball against the St. Louis Cardinals at Wrigley Field. He earned a second  save nine days later when he preserved a 5–4 Cubs' triumph against the San Francisco Giants at Seals Stadium. At that point, Rodríguez' earned run average was a respectable 3.18, but he was hit hard in his next three outings, and by the time he was demoted to the minors after May 18, his ERA was a poor 7.36 in 7 innings pitched. Obtained by the Phillies during the 1958–1959 offseason, he received only a one-game audition in June, when he allowed three earned runs in two innings pitched in middle relief against the Cincinnati Reds at Crosley Field on May 27. He then returned to the minor leagues for the next 3 seasons.

In his eight MLB games, Rodríguez allowed 12 hits (including three home runs) and five bases on balls in his career 9 innings pitched, with six strikeouts. Along with his two career saves, he compiled an ERA of 8.68. Fernando "Freddy" Rodríguez died in Miami, Florida, on June 11, 2009.

References

External links

1924 births
2009 deaths
Abilene Blue Sox players
Big Spring Broncs players
Buffalo Bisons (minor league) players
Chicago Cubs players
Cuban expatriate baseball players in Canada
Dallas Eagles players
Diablos Rojos del México players
Greenville Spinners players
Havana Cubans players
Kingsport Cherokees players
Major League Baseball pitchers
Major League Baseball players from Cuba
Cuban expatriate baseball players in the United States
Midland Indians players
Minneapolis Millers (baseball) players
Montreal Royals players
Pensacola Fliers players
Portland Beavers players
Sherman–Denison Twins players
St. Paul Saints (AA) players
Baseball players from Havana
Tecolotes de Nuevo Laredo players
Williamsport Grays players
Cuban expatriate baseball players in Mexico